Pecten fumatus is a species of bivalve belonging to the family Pectinidae.

The species has almost cosmopolitan distribution.

References

Pectinidae